The 1970 Virginia Tech Gobblers football team represented Virginia Polytechnic Institute and State University in the 1970 NCAA University Division football season.

Schedule

Players
The following players were members of the 1970 football team according to the roster published in the 1971 edition of The Bugle, the Virginia Tech yearbook.

References

VPI
Virginia Tech Hokies football seasons
VPI Gobblers football